Tom & Viv is a 1994 historical drama film directed by Brian Gilbert, based on the 1984 play of the same name by British playwright Michael Hastings about the early love life of American poet T. S. Eliot. The film stars Willem Dafoe, Miranda Richardson, Rosemary Harris, Tim Dutton, and Nickolas Grace.

Premise
The film tells the story of the relationship between T. S. Eliot and his first wife, Vivienne Haigh-Wood Eliot. They were married in 1915 after a brief courtship and, although they separated in 1933, they never divorced.

Cast
 Willem Dafoe ... T. S. Eliot
 Miranda Richardson ... Vivienne Haigh-Wood Eliot
 Rosemary Harris ... Rose Robinson Haigh-Wood
 Tim Dutton ... Maurice Haigh-Wood
 Nickolas Grace ... Bertrand Russell
 Geoffrey Bayldon ... Harwent
 Clare Holman ... Louise Purdon
 Philip Locke ... Charles Haigh-Wood
 Joanna McCallum ... Virginia Woolf
 Joseph O'Conor ... Bishop of Oxford
 John Savident ... Sir Frederick Lamb
 Michael Attwell ... W. I. Janes
 Sharon Bower ... Secretary
 Linda Spurrier.... Edith Sitwell
 Roberta Taylor ... Ottoline Morrell
 Christopher Baines ... Verger
Anna Chancellor ... Woman 
John Clegg ... Second Man
James Greene ... Dr. Cryiax
Simon McBurney ... Dr. Reginald Miller

Reception
The film received mixed reviews. It holds a 36% approval rating on review aggregate Rotten Tomatoes, based on 14 reviews, with an average rating of 5.20/10. Owen Gleiberman of Entertainment Weekly praised the performances, but gave the film a B−, saying '[it] is the kind of sodden, tasteful, here-are-a-few-nasty-warts-to-chew-on biography that raises as many dramatic questions as it answers.' Derek Elley of Variety admired the film's artistic aspirations and production values, but called it, 'a handsomely appointed but overly starchy love story that attains real clout only in the final reel.'

Awards
The film was nominated for Academy Awards in the categories Best Actress in a Leading Role (Miranda Richardson) and Best Actress in a Supporting Role (Rosemary Harris).

Year-end lists 
 9th – National Board of Review

References

External links 
 
 
 

1994 films
1990s biographical drama films
1990s historical films
American biographical drama films
British biographical drama films
Biographical films about writers
T. S. Eliot
I.R.S. Media films
Biographical films about poets
Films about Nobel laureates
1994 drama films
Films directed by Brian Gilbert
1990s English-language films
1990s American films
1990s British films